Face to Face is a 2019 Sri Lankan Sinhala action thriller film directed by Harsha Udakanda and co-produced by Shermal Dilshan and Sahan Abeywardane for HU Films and Flash Entertainments. It stars Roshan Ranawana and Dineth De Silva in lead roles along with Sriyantha Mendis and Oshadi Himasha. Music composed by Niroshan Dreams.

The film has received mixed reviews from critics.

Plot

Cast
 Roshan Ranawana as Rose
 Dineth De Silva as Iresh		
 Sriyantha Mendis as Rose's father		
 Oshadi Himasha as Amaya
 Amila Karunanayake as Police inspector		
 Rohani Weerasinghe as Amaya's mother
 Ashika Mathasinghe as Doctor
 Rajitha Hiran as Mahesh
 D.B. Gangodathenna
 Shehani Perera	
 Wilman Sirimanne as Driver Jalal
 Kumara Ranepura
 Jayarathna Galagedara		
 Kumara Waduressa

Soundtrack
The film consists with two songs.

References

External links
 
 Official trailer

2019 films
2010s Sinhala-language films